The Most Exciting Organ Ever is the second album by Billy Preston. The fully instrumental album was released in 1965, several weeks before Preston's nineteenth birthday, at a time when he was a regular  performer on the ABC TV pop music series Shindig! The album includes "Billy's Bag", which was a favorite among British musicians and club-goers at the time. Preston included a live version of the track on his 1974 album Live European Tour.

Extra songs recorded during the sessions for The Most Exciting Organ Ever were released on Preston's next studio album.

Track listing
All songs by Billy Preston, except where noted.

"If I Had a Hammer" (Lee Hays, Pete Seeger) – 2:54
"Low Down" – 2:13
"Slippin' and Slidin'" (Richard Penniman, Edwin Bocage, Al Collins, James Smith) – 3:06
"Drown in My Own Tears" (Henry Glover) – 3:24
"I Am Coming Through" – 2:04
"The Octopus" – 2:13
"Don't Let the Sun Catch You Cryin'" (Joe Greene) – 2:30
"Soul Meetin'" (Don Covay) – 2:42
"Let Me Know" (Ted Wright) – 2:05
"Billy's Bag" – 3:48
"The Masquerade Is Over" (Herbert Magidson, Allie Wrubel) – 4:20
"Steady Gettin' It" – 2:50

References

Billy Preston albums
Vee-Jay Records albums
1965 debut albums